The Roazhon Park is a football stadium in Rennes, Brittany, France. Roazhon  is the Breton name of Rennes.

The stadium was inaugurated on 15 September 1912. It is located at 111 route de Lorient, in west-central Rennes. Rebuilt in 2001 and able to seat 29,778, the stadium is currently the home of Stade Rennais.

The stadium has hosted France men's and women's national football team matches. On 19 and 20 June 2016 it hosted the semifinals of the Top 14 rugby union tournament. It was also selected as a venue for the 2019 FIFA Women's World Cup, in which it hosted six matches: four in the group stage, one in the Round of 16, and one quarter final.

2019 FIFA Women's World Cup matches

References

Buildings and structures in Rennes
Route de Lorient
Stade Rennais F.C.
Sports venues in Rennes
Sports venues completed in 1912
2019 FIFA Women's World Cup stadiums